Furg may refer to:
Furg, Darmian, a village in Darmian County, South Khorasan Province, Iran
 Furg citadel, a 12th-century citadel
 Fur Jan, also known as Furg,  a village in Birjand County, South Khorasan Province, Iran

FURG may refer to:
 Fundação Universidade Federal do Rio Grande, a public Brazilian university funded by the Brazilian federal government, located in the city of Rio Grande, Rio Grande do Sul

See also 
 Fourg, a commune in France